The Taipei Metro St. Ignatius High School station is a station on the Zhonghe–Xinlu line located in Luzhou District, New Taipei, Taiwan. The station opened on 3 November 2010. It will be a transfer station with the Circular Line in 2029.

Station overview
This three-level, underground station is located at the intersection of Jixian Rd. and Zhongxian 1st Rd. and opened on 3 November 2010 with the opening of the Luzhou Line.

Construction
Excavation depth for this station is around 32 meters. It is 151 meters in length and 23 meters wide. It has two entrances, one emergency exit, one accessibility elevator, and two vent shafts. Exit B is integrated with a joint development building.

For the Circular Line station, the platform level has already been set aside (according to the current station layout).

Station Design
The theme for the station is "Reeds Swaying in the Moonlight", as part of a common theme of egrets for the Luzhou Line.

Station layout

Exits
Exit 1: St. Ignatius High School
Exit 2: Yongan N. Rd., Sec. 2

Around the station
Luzhou Post Office
St. Ignatius High School
Yongfu Elementary School
Nicaragua Park
Bihua Cloth Street

References

Zhonghe–Xinlu line stations
Railway stations opened in 2010